Spring Grove is an unincorporated community in Dallas County, in the U.S. state of Missouri. The community is situated on Missouri Route H and the Niangua River flows past, about 1.5 miles to the east. Buffalo is approximately six miles to the north-northwest.

History
A post office called Spring Grove was established in 1854, and remained in operation until 1906. A spring within a nearby grove accounts for the name.

References

Unincorporated communities in Dallas County, Missouri
Unincorporated communities in Missouri